Rogoźno  is a town in Poland, in Greater Poland Voivodeship, about 40 km north of Poznań. Its population is 11,337  (2010). It is the seat of the administrative district (gmina) called Gmina Rogoźno.

History

Rogoźno dates back to a Lechitic (early Polish) stronghold from the 8th-9th century. Its name is of Old Polish origin, and comes from the word rogoża, which means "typha". The oldest known mention in documents comes from 1192. From the mid-12th century it was a seat of a castellan and in 1280 it was granted town rights by Przemysł II. King Przemysł II of Poland was murdered in or near Rogoźno in 1296. According to one tradition he was kidnapped while staying at the town, but was so badly wounded in the process that he was unable to continue the journey, and was killed by his captors at Sierniki a few miles to the east. Rogoźno was a royal town of Poland, administratively located in the Poznań County in the Poznań Voivodeship in the Greater Poland Province of the Polish Crown.

The town was annexed by Prussia in the Second Partition of Poland in 1793. In 1807 it was regained by Poles and included within the short-lived Duchy of Warsaw, in 1815 it was reannexed by Prussia, and from 1871 it was also part of Germany. The town was subjected to Germanisation policies. In 1906–1907, local Polish school children protested against Germanisation. In November 1918, Poland regained independence and the Greater Poland uprising (1918–19) broke out, which goal was to reintegrate the town and region with the reborn state. Rogoźno was eventually liberated by Polish insurgents on December 31, 1918.

During the joint German-Soviet invasion of Poland, which started World War II in September 1939, the town was invaded by Germany, and then occupied until 1945. The Polish population was subjected to various crimes, including arrests, massacres and expulsions. Already in September, some inhabitants of Rogoźno were among Poles massacred by the Germans in nearby villages of Podlesie Kościelne and Międzylesie. In late 1939, around 900 Poles were expelled from the town and its surroundings. The Germans also established and operated a Nazi prison in the town.

Sports
It competes in the lower leagues.

Notable residents
 Rudolf Bornhof (1914–1944), Wehrmacht officer
 Marcus Jastrow (1829–1903), Talmudic scholar
 Antoni Przybylski (1913–1985), Polish-Australian astronomer

References

External links
 Official town website

Cities and towns in Greater Poland Voivodeship
Oborniki County